Jungle City Studios is a recording studio owned and operated by Ann Mincieli, Alicia Keys's longtime engineer and studio coordinator. Located in Chelsea, Manhattan, it was designed by John Storyk of Walters-Storyk Design Group.

Recordings at Jungle City Studios

Beyoncé – 4 (2011)
Professor Green – At Your Inconvenience (2011)
Cher Lloyd – Sticks and Stones (2011)
Rihanna – Talk That Talk (2011)
Emeli Sandé – Our Version of Events (2012)
fun. – Some Nights (2012) 
Rick Ross – God Forgives, I Don't (2012)
DJ Khaled – Kiss the Ring (2012)
Alicia Keys – Girl on Fire (2012)
Justin Timberlake – The 20/20 Experience (2013)
Depeche Mode – Delta Machine (2013)
Kelly Rowland – Talk a Good Game (2013)
Robin Thicke – Blurred Lines (2013)
Nas – Life Is Good (2012)
Justin Timberlake – The 20/20 Experience – 2 of 2 (2013)
Jay-Z – Magna Carta Holy Grail (2013)
Pusha T – My Name Is My Name (2013)
M.I.A. – Matangi (2013)
Beyoncé – Beyoncé (2013)
Pharrell Williams – Girl (2014)
Iggy Azalea – The New Classic (2014)
Mariah Carey – Me. I Am Mariah... The Elusive Chanteuse (2014)
Irma – Faces (2014)
Jon Bellion – The Definition (2014)
Ed Sheeran – x (2014)
Michael Jackson – "A Place with No Name" (2014)
Nicki Minaj – The Pinkprint (2014)
J. Cole – 2014 Forest Hills Drive (2014)
Taylor Swift – 1989 (2014)
Justin Bieber – Purpose (2015)
Beyoncé – Lemonade (2016)
Rihanna – Anti (2016)
Zayn – Mind of Mine (2016)
Alicia Keys – Here (2016)
Kendrick Lamar – DAMN. (2017)
Lorde – Melodrama (2017)
Demi Lovato – Tell Me You Love Me (2017)
Nicki Minaj – Queen (2018)
Ariana Grande – Thank U, Next (2019)
The Weeknd – After Hours (2020)
Alicia Keys - Alicia (2020)
Ariana Grande – Positions (2020)
Sabrina Carpenter – Emails I Can't Send (2022)
Future (rapper) - I Never Liked You (album) (2022)

References

External links

Recording studios in Manhattan
Chelsea, Manhattan
Recording studios owned by women